C.M.B. is the debut album by American recording act Color Me Badd, released July 23, 1991, on Giant Records. It was produced by several record producers, including Dr. Freeze, Nick Mundy, and Howie Tee.

The album received mixed reviews from critics who found the production and lyrics generic despite some decent vocal work. C.M.B. peaked at number 3 on the US Billboard 200 and spawned seven singles:
"I Wanna Sex You Up", "I Adore Mi Amor", "All 4 Love", "Color Me Badd", "Thinkin' Back", "Heartbreaker" and "Slow Motion". The album was certified triple platinum by the Recording Industry Association of America (RIAA), denoting shipments of three million copies in the country.

Commercial performance 
The album reached number three on the US Billboard 200, spending 77 weeks on the chart, and shipped one million copies within its first two months of release in the United States. It also charted at number three in the United Kingdom, and it was certified gold by the British Phonographic Industry on September 1, 1991, having shipped 100,000 copies in the UK. It produced five US hit singles, "I Wanna Sex You Up" (US #2), "I Adore Mi Amor" (US #1), "All 4 Love" (US #1), "Thinkin' Back" (US #16), and "Slow Motion" (US #18). On July 15, 1992, C.M.B was certified triple platinum by the Recording Industry Association of America (RIAA), for shipments of three million copies in the US.

Critical reception 
Arion Berger of Entertainment Weekly gave the album a "C+" and criticized its content: "However decent C.M.B.'s intentions of turning street-corner harmonies into dance-floor grooves, nothing on their debut — not their four fine voices, glossy production, or titillating youthful smut — sounds honest". In his consumer guide for The Village Voice, critic Robert Christgau gave it a one-star honorable mention, indicating "a worthy effort consumers attuned to its overriding aesthetic or individual vision may well like". In a retrospective review of the album, AllMusic editor Alex Henderson gave C.M.B. four out of five stars and said that "most of the songs are pedestrian and generic", but wrote that it "does have its moments, including the hit slow jams 'I Adore Mi Amor' and 'I Wanna Sex You Up' (which samples rapper Slick Rick in a rather clever fashion)".

Track listing 

Notes
  signifies a co-producer

Personnel 
Credits for C.M.B. adapted from AllMusic.

 Bryan Abrams – vocals
 Royal Bayyan – producer, mixing
 Mark Calderon – vocals
 Steve Casper – assistant engineer
 Pavel DeJesus – assistant engineer
 Buck Dewit – assistant engineer
 D'La Vance – keyboards
 Dr. Freeze – producer, mixing
 Michael Fossenkemper – engineer
 Michael Lavine – photography
 Hamza Lee – keyboards, producer, mixing
 Josh Melville – engineer
 Cassandra Mills – executive producer

 Nick Mundy – arranger, programming, producer, engineer
 Angela Piva – engineer
 James Pollock – engineer, mixing
 Johnny Potoker – mixing
 Donna Roth – assistant engineer
 Doug Schwartz – engineer
 Donnell Spencer – drum programming
 Spyderman – producer, mixing
 Howie Tee – producer, engineer, mixing
 Kevin Thornton – vocals
 Dirk Walter – design
 Sam Watters – vocals
 Warren Woods – engineer, mixing

Charts

Weekly charts

Year-end charts

Certifications

References

External links 
 

Color Me Badd albums
1991 debut albums
Albums produced by Howie Tee
Reprise Records albums
Warner Records albums
Giant Records (Warner) albums